Huntsville (North) Water Aerodrome  is located on Lake Vernon,  west of Huntsville, Ontario, Canada.

See also
Huntsville (Memorial District Hospital) Heliport
Huntsville Water Aerodrome
Huntsville/Bella Lake Water Aerodrome
Huntsville/Deerhurst Resort Airport

References

Registered aerodromes in Ontario
Seaplane bases in Ontario